Xiakou is a town of Pingshan County, Shijiazhuang, Hebei, China. , it has 20 villages under its administration.

See also
List of township-level divisions of Hebei

References

Township-level divisions of Hebei
Pingshan County, Hebei